James Philip Vincent Kelly (10 July 1939 – 11 August 2012) was an Irish footballer who played at both professional and international levels as a full back.

Career

Club career
Born in Dublin, Kelly played in the Football League for Wolverhampton Wanderers and Norwich City, making a total of 131 appearances. He later became player-manager at non-league club Lowestoft Town.

International career
Kelly earned five caps with the Republic of Ireland during 1960 to 1961.

References

1939 births
Republic of Ireland association footballers
Republic of Ireland international footballers
Wolverhampton Wanderers F.C. players
Norwich City F.C. players
Lowestoft Town F.C. players
English Football League players
2012 deaths
Association football fullbacks